Sahibzada Mohammad Khurshid (July 1901 – after 1950) was the first Pakistani governor of the Khyber-Pakhtunkhwa of Pakistan and a former Chief Commissioner of Balochistan. Prior to the independence of Pakistan, the governor had been appointed by the government of British India (based in Calcutta and later Delhi). For almost two years after independence, Pakistan continued to have British governors until the appointment of Sahibzada Khurshid.

Sahibzada Muhammad Khurshid was educated in India and then at the Royal Military College, Sandhurst, from where he was commissioned a Second Lieutenant onto the Unattached List for the Indian Army on the 31 August 1922. He was attached to the 2nd battalion, the Cameronians, as of 12 October 1922, as all new Indian Army officers did a year attached to a British Regiment in India. He was admitted to the Indian Army and posted to the 1st battalion 14th Punjab Regiment as of 23 October 1923. He was promoted Lieutenant 30 November 1924.

He transferred to the Foreign and Political Department of the Government of India 30 June 1927, and by January 1931 he was the Assistant Political Agent, Zhob (Baluchistan).

He was promoted Captain 31 August 1931.

By January 1939 he was the Assistant Political Officer, Chitral, and by October 1939 he was the Political Agent Dir, Swat & Chitral.

He was a competent bureaucrat which brought him in the good graces of Quaid-e-Azam Muhammad Ali Jinnah, and thus earned him the highest nomination in KPK.

References

Governors of Khyber Pakhtunkhwa
British Indian Army officers
1901 births
Year of death missing